Danny Neuman is an Israeli sports commentator, formerly a soccer player and team manager.

References

External links
Sports Media: The Danny Neuman I know is no racist

1955 births
Israeli Jews
Living people
Israeli footballers
Beitar Jerusalem F.C. players
Maccabi Tel Aviv F.C. players
Liga Leumit players
Israel international footballers
Israeli football managers
Hapoel Jerusalem F.C. managers
Footballers from Jerusalem
Association football midfielders